Estefania Knuth (born 4 May 1973) is a Spanish professional golfer and former member of the Ladies European Tour. She won the 1992 Espirito Santo Trophy and the 1995 Singapore Ladies Open.

Career
Knuth was born in Barcelona and had a successful amateur career. She won the 1989 Junior Orange Bowl in Florida and was runner-up at the European Ladies Amateur championship in 1990 and 1993. She won the French International Lady Juniors Amateur Championship twice, and won the 1992 French Ladies Amateur ahead of compatriot Laura Navarro.

Knuth won the 1992 Espirito Santo Trophy in Vancouver, Canada together with Macarena Campomanes and Laura Navarro, and won gold at the 1993 Mediterranean Games in France both individually and in the team event together with Marina Arruti and Navarro.

Knuth turned professional 1993 and joined the Ladies European Tour. Her best finish was a tie for third at the 1998 Austrian Ladies Open, two strokes behind Lynnette Brooky of New Zealand.

In 1995, she won the Singapore Ladies Open on the Ladies Asian Golf Tour.

Amateur wins
1989 Junior Orange Bowl
1990 French International Lady Juniors Amateur Championship
1992 French International Lady Juniors Amateur Championship, French Ladies Amateur
1993 Mediterranean Games (individual)

Professional wins (1)

Ladies Asian Golf Tour wins (1)
1995 Singapore Ladies Open

Team appearances
Amateur
European Lady Junior's Team Championship (representing Spain): 1992 (winners)
European Ladies' Team Championship (representing Spain): 1993
Vagliano Trophy (representing the Continent of Europe): 1993
Espirito Santo Trophy: (representing Spain): 1990, 1992 (winners)

References

Spanish female golfers
Ladies European Tour golfers
Mediterranean Games medalists in golf
Mediterranean Games gold medalists for Spain
Competitors at the 1993 Mediterranean Games
Sportspeople from Barcelona
1973 births
Living people
20th-century Spanish women
21st-century Spanish women